Ruth Wendy Holmes  (née; Langsford; born 17 March 1960) is an English television presenter. She has presented various television shows, including This Morning (1999–present) in which she is the longest serving presenter, Gift Wrapped (2014), How the Other Half Lives (2015–present), and Ruth Langsford’s Fashion Edit (2017–present). Since 1999, Langsford has been a regular panellist on the ITV talk show Loose Women, becoming a presenter in 2013. In 2017, she took part in the fifteenth series of Strictly Come Dancing, in which she finished in ninth place.

Early life

Ruth Langsford was born in Singapore, to Dennis and Joan Langsford. She lived in five countries before the age of ten, including West Germany and four countries in North Africa. Langsford attended Saltash School in Cornwall from 1977 to 1978.

Career

Television
Langsford began her career as a continuity announcer and newscaster with ITV regional station Television South West (TSW) in Plymouth, England. She left TSW when Westcountry Television took over the franchise on 1 January 1993, closing down the station with fellow announcer, Ian Stirling.

From 1999 until 2002, Langsford was a regular panellist on ITV's daytime chat show Loose Women. In 2010, she returned to the show as a stand-in anchor until 2013. Langsford rejoined Loose Women on 8 January 2014 as a regular anchor. She anchors the show in rotation with Jane Moore, Charlene White, Christine Lampard and Kaye Adams.

In 2000, Langsford became a guest presenter on This Morning, and was made a regular presenter in 2006 where she co-hosted alongside Phillip Schofield, making her the longest serving presenter of the programme. Later that year, the show introduced Eamonn Holmes to co-host with Langsford every Friday. 

Langsford was one of the main presenters on the now defunct TV Travel Shop which was on air from April 1998 until March 2005. She also hosted The Answer Lies in the Soil (1999), The Great British Garden Show, Langsford Late (1999), The Really Useful Show (1997), Mysterious West (1995) and Gardens of the Millennium (1999).

In 2004, Langsford narrated the television series Zoo Story. She guest presented five episodes of GMTV with Lorraine in 2010. Langsford was a contestant on Marco's Kitchen Burnout in 2010 and competed in Born to Shine in 2011.

In 2014, Langsford and Eamonn Holmes co-hosted ten episodes of the ITV teatime quiz show Gift Wrapped.

Since 2015, Langsford and Holmes have presented Channel 5 series How the Other Half Lives, and a third in 2017.

In February 2017, Langsford began co-presenting Ruth Langsford's Fashion Edit alongside Jackie Kabler for QVC.

On 9 August 2017, Langsford was the third celebrity announced to be taking part in the fifteenth series of Strictly Come Dancing. Her professional partner was Anton du Beke. She was the seventh celebrity to be eliminated, and left the show on 12 November.

From March 2018, Langsford co-presented Do the Right Thing with Eamonn Holmes on Channel 5.

In 2019 and again in 2020, Langsford co-presented the Channel 5 dieting series Lose a Stone in Four Weeks for Summer, alongside GP Amir Khan.

Other work
In September 2010, Langsford co-hosted the breakfast show on BBC London 94.9 alongside Paul Ross.

In 2011, Langsford became the brand ambassador for Playtex.

In 2013, Langsford became brand ambassador for Clarivu refractive lens exchange procedure sold by Optegra.

Langsford has written columns for Woman Magazine and Tesco Magazine. She was an ambassador for two Tesco food campaigns.

She was on the judging panel for the Pride of Britain Awards in 2016.

Personal life

In 1996, Langsford began dating Eamonn Holmes, though the two kept their relationship secret for years out of respect for Holmes' first wife, Gabrielle, from whom he was separated at the time. In 2002, Langsford gave birth to their son, Jack Alexander Holmes. They were married on 26 June 2010.

Filmography

Television

See also
 List of Strictly Come Dancing contestants

References

External links
Official website

Ruth Langsford at James Grant Media

1960 births
Living people
English television presenters
English game show hosts